Manikku Wadumestri Hendrick de Silva, QC (22 September 1886 - 6 March 1960) was a Ceylonese lawyer, judge and statesman. He served in several top legal positions in the island, as the  26th Attorney General of Ceylon, a Puisne Justice of the Supreme Court of Ceylon and finally the Minister of Justice in the cabinet of S. W. R. D. Bandaranaike as a member of the Senate of Ceylon.

Legal career 
Having graduated from the University of London, de Silva became an Advocate. Joining the Attorney General's Department, de Silva served as a Crown Counsel and a Senior Crown Counsel, before being appointed Deputy Solicitor General. As Deputy Solicitor General, de Silva led the prosecution of the famous Duff House murder case in 1934. He served as Solicitor General of Ceylon from 1941 to 1942, in which year he was also appointed King's Counsel. He was appointed Attorney General of Ceylon on 7 July 1942, succeeding John William Ronald Illangakoon, and held the office until 1946. He was succeeded by Chellappah Nagalingam. He was thereafter called to the bench as an acting Puisne Judge, but retired in 1947 to take up appointment as Representative of the Government of Ceylon in India, serving until Ceylon gained self rule in 1948. In 1949, he chaired the commission of inquiry to investigate allegations of bribery in the  Colombo Municipal Council.

Minister of Justice 
He was appointed to the Senate of Ceylon and made Minister of Justice by Prime Minister S. W. R. D. Bandaranaike in 1956. He introduced conciliation boards through the Conciliation Broads Act and attempted to regulate fees charged by proctors and advocates, but was met by stiff resistance from the legal practitioners which included threats of trade union action. He served until June 1959 when he resigned from the Cabinet, two days after a Cabinet reshuffle in which he retained the seat.

Family 
He was the great uncle of Harsha de Silva.

References

Justice ministers of Sri Lanka
Members of the Senate of Ceylon
Attorneys General of British Ceylon
Solicitors General of Ceylon
Puisne Justices of the Supreme Court of Ceylon
Sinhalese judges
Sinhalese lawyers
Ceylonese advocates
20th-century King's Counsel
Ceylonese Queen's Counsel
High Commissioners of Sri Lanka to India
1886 births
1960 deaths